At least two ships of the Hellenic Navy have borne the name Nearchos after the ancient Cretan admiral Nearchus:

 , a  launched in 1943 as USS Wadsworth and transferred to Germany in 1959 as Z-3. She was transferred to Greece and renamed  Nearchos in 1980 serving until scrapping in 1991.
 , a  launched in 1963 as USS Waddell she was transferred to Greece in 1992 and renamed. She was sunk as a target in 2006.
 , a  under construction since 2022, projected to be commissioned in 2025.

Hellenic Navy ship names